These are lists of battles of the French Revolutionary and Napoleonic Wars (1792–1815).

Coalition Wars
 List of battles of the War of the First Coalition (20 April 1792 – 18 October 1797)
 List of battles of the War of the Second Coalition (1798/9 – 1801/2)
 List of battles of the War of the Third Coalition (1803/1805–1805/1806)
 List of battles of the War of the Fourth Coalition (9 October 1806 – 9 July 1807)
 List of battles of the War of the Fifth Coalition (10 April – 14 October 1809)
 List of battles of the War of the Sixth Coalition (3 March 1813 – 30 May 1814)
 List of battles of the Hundred Days (War of the Seventh Coalition) (15/20 March – 8 July / 16 August 1815)

Other French Revolutionary Wars
 Haitian Revolution (21 August 1791 – 1 January 1804) 
 War of the Pyrenees (7 March 1793 – 22 July 1795) 
 War in the Vendée § Vendée military response (3 March 1793 – 16 July 1796) 
 French invasion of Switzerland § Battles (28 January – 17 May 1798)

Naval warfare:
 Naval campaigns, operations and battles of the French Revolutionary Wars

Other Napoleonic Wars
 Timeline of the Peninsular War (1807/8–1815)
 Franco-Swedish War (1805–1810) 
 Gunboat War (1807–1814)

 Timeline of the Adriatic campaign of 1807–1814
 Timeline of the Finnish War (1808–1809)
 Dano-Swedish War of 1808–09 
 List of battles of the French invasion of Russia (24 June – 14/18 December 1812)

See also 
 Attrition warfare against Napoleon
 Battles inscribed on the Arc de Triomphe
 List of battles involving France
 List of wars involving France
 List of Marshals of the First French Empire
 Military career of Napoleon Bonaparte

French First Republic
First French Empire